The 1955–56 Cypriot First Division was the 19th season of the Cypriot top-level football league.

Overview
It was contested by 9 teams, and AEL Limassol won the championship.

League standings

Results

References
Cyprus - List of final tables (RSSSF)

Cypriot First Division seasons
Cypriot First Division, 1955-56
1